Fusinus tenerifensis is a species of sea snail, a marine gastropod mollusc in the family Fasciolariidae, the spindle snails, the tulip snails and their allies.

Description
The length of the shell attains 21.8 mm.

Distribution
This marine species occurs off Tenerife, Canary Islands.

References

 Hadorn R. & Rolán E. (1999). Two new Fusinus (Gastropoda: Fasciolariidae) from northwest Africa and the Canary Islands, including a brief description of the type material of Fusinus crassus (Pallary, 1901). Argonauta 13(1): 39-47
 Gofas, S.; Le Renard, J.; Bouchet, P. (2001). Mollusca. in: Costello, M.J. et al. (eds), European Register of Marine Species: a check-list of the marine species in Europe and a bibliography of guides to their identification. Patrimoines Naturels. 50: 180-213. 

tenerifensis
Gastropods described in 1999